New York's 140th State Assembly district is one of the 150 districts in the New York State Assembly. It has been represented by Democrat William Conrad III since 2021, replacing 44-year Assemblyman Robin Schimminger.

Geography 
District 140 consists of parts of Erie County and Niagara County.  It contains North Buffalo, the town of Tonawanda, the city of Tonawanda, and part of North Tonawanda.

Recent election results

2022

2020

2018

2016

2014

2012

2010

References

140
Erie County, New York
Niagara County, New York